National Highway 761, commonly referred to as NH 761 is a national highway in India. It is a secondary route of National Highway 61.  NH-761 runs in the state of Maharashtra in India.

Route 
NH761 connects Belhe, Alkuti, Devibhoyare, Nighoj and Shirur in the state of Maharashtra.

Junctions  
 
  Terminal near Belhe.
  Terminal near Shirur.

See also 
 List of National Highways in India
 List of National Highways in India by state

References

External links 

 NH 761 on OpenStreetMap

National highways in India
National Highways in Maharashtra